Charles Henry "Bill" Sykes (November 12, 1882 – December 19, 1942) was an American cartoonist associated with the Philadelphia Public Ledger and Evening Ledger from 1911 until its closing in 1942. 

Born in Athens, Alabama, to William Henry and Jane Palmyra Sykes (nee Hayes), Sykes attended the Drexel Institute in Philadelphia, graduating in 1904. He did freelance work for two years before entering newspaper work in 1906, with the Philadelphia North American and Williamsport News. He then worked for the Nashville Banner in Tennessee until 1911 before joining the Public Ledger later that same year. When the Public Ledger was reorganized into the Evening Ledger in 1914, he became that paper's first editorial cartoonist, and remained its only cartoonist until its dissolution in early 1942. He married Charlotte Kennedy Hannum on September 11, 1907. He was an editorial cartoonist for Life magazine from 1922 to 1928. He also designed insignia for several army units, and received a National Headliner Award in 1941.
 
Sykes's early work was distinguished by usage of coquille board for shading. His later work incorporated crayon and wash. Cartoon historian Richard Marschall described Sykes's technique as "one of the most amiable styles in all cartooning. His perspectives were unique, his anatomy precise, and his shading almost theatrical." A 1918 cartoon promoting the fourth Liberty Loan won a gold medal from the Liberty Loan Committee.  In 1980, over 300 of his cartoons and sketches were donated to Virginia Commonwealth University.

References

External links
 
 Charles Henry Sykes Cartoon Collection  at Virginia Commonwealth University
 Charles H. Sykes Papers at the Historical Society of Pennsylvania

1882 births
1942 deaths
American editorial cartoonists
People from Athens, Alabama
Artists from Philadelphia
Drexel University alumni